was a Japanese female idol group and fashion model.
They were managed by ASOBISYSTEM which is known for also managing Kyary Pamyu Pamyu.

About 
Musubizum was formed on December 19, 2014 by six members
(Misa Kimura, Uni Wada, Eru Shiina, Nami Yamada, Mai Imai and Rurika Miyajima) chosen 
from candidates of “ASOBI SYSTEM IDOL PROJECT.”
In addition to idol activity, they sometimes work as fashion models.

The group concept was "Musubizm tie together Japanese kawaii culture and the world."
("Musubi" is a verb that means "tying, connecting and uniting" in Japanese.)

The group dissolved on December 10, 2017.

Members 

Past member
Uni Wada - Active period : December 19, 2014 - April 30, 2015

Main history

2014 
December 19 - Declared the organization of the group.

2015 
March 23 - Took part in "5iVESTAR". They performed a concert and a fashion show.
March 26 - Took part in "Ustream Sound Gradation".
April 30 - Uni Wada withdrew from the group.
August 1 - Took part in "Tokyo Idol Festival".
August 8 - Took part in "J POP SUMMIT 2015" at San Francisco, US.

2017 
December 10 - Dissolve.

References

External links 
 
 Official Youtube channel

Japanese idol groups
Japanese girl groups
Japanese female models